These are the official results of the Men's triple jump event at the 1999 World Championships in Seville, Spain. There were a total number of 39 participating athletes, with the final held on Wednesday 25 August 1999.

Medalists

Schedule
All times are Central European Time (UTC+1)

Abbreviations
All results shown are in metres

Qualification
 Held on Monday 23 August 1999 with the mark set on 17.00 metres (6 + 6 athletes)

Final

References
 IAAF 
 Results 
 trackandfieldnews

D
Triple jump at the World Athletics Championships